The 1881 Rutgers Queensmen football team represented Rutgers University as an independent during the 1881 college football season. The team compiled a 2–4–1 record and outscored its opponents, 11 to 8. The team had no coach, and its captain for the second consecutive year was John Morrison.

Schedule

References

Rutgers
Rutgers Scarlet Knights football seasons
Rutgers Queensmen football